George Duggan may refer to:

 George Duggan (politician) (1812–1876), lawyer, judge and political figure in Canada West
 George Duggan (priest) (1912–2012), New Zealand Marist priest, philosopher, seminary professor and writer
 George Duggan, character in Silk (TV series)